Bingamon is an unincorporated community in Marion County, in the U.S. state of West Virginia.

History
A post office called Bingamon was established in 1854, and remained in operation until 1900. The community derives its name from one Mr. Bingaman, an early settler.

References

Unincorporated communities in Marion County, West Virginia
Unincorporated communities in West Virginia